The following is a list of county roads in Madison County, Florida.  All county roads are maintained by the county in which they reside.

County roads in Madison County, Florida

References

FDOT Map of Madison County
FDOT GIS data, accessed January 2014

 
County